John Hartman (March 18, 1950 – December 29, 2021) was an American drummer who was a co-founder and original drummer of the Doobie Brothers. At the band's inception, Hartman was the sole drummer. However, in late 1971, the group added second drummer Michael Hossack, and the dual-drummers formation remained until 2016 when Ed Toth became the band's sole drummer. (Hossack was replaced in 1973 by Keith Knudsen.)

Early life

Music
Hartman played on all of the Doobie Brothers' major hits of the 1970s with both Tom Johnston and Michael McDonald. He left early in 1979 following a promotional tour in support of the award-winning Minute by Minute album to look after Arabian horses on his California ranch.

Hartman was enticed to join twelve Doobies alumni (including drummers Hossack, Knudsen, and Hartman's own 1979 replacement Chet McCracken) for a brief benefit tour in 1987. Hartman subsequently rejoined when the band was reconstituted the following year. He played on the reunion albums Cycles (1989) and Brotherhood (1991) as well as the accompanying promotional tours. However, following a 1992 alumni reunion for the benefit of terminally ill percussionist Bobby LaKind, Hartman retired permanently from the band. In typical Doobies fashion, he was replaced by his former partner, Keith Knudsen.

Hartman was inducted into the Rock and Roll Hall of Fame as a member of The Doobie Brothers in 2020.

In September 2022, The Doobie Brothers announced Hartman's death. Hartman had died on December 29, 2021, at the age of 71. Because of the delayed announcement, Hartman's death was widely misreported as occurring in 2022.

Discography

Albums 
The Doobie Brothers (1971)
Toulouse Street (1972) (US #21)
The Captain and Me (1973) (US #7)
What Were Once Vices Are Now Habits (1974) (US #4)
Stampede (1975) (US #4)
Takin' It to the Streets (1976) (US #8)
Livin' on the Fault Line (1977) (US #10)
Minute by Minute (1978) (US #1)
Cycles (1989) (US #17)
Brotherhood (1991) (US #82)
On Our Way Up (2001)
Divided Highway (2003) (consisting of tunes from Cycles and Brotherhood)
Live at the Greek Theater 1982 [Live] (2011) (guest appearance on one song)

References

External links
 
 

1950 births
2021 deaths
American rock drummers
The Doobie Brothers members
20th-century American drummers
American male drummers
20th-century American male musicians
People from Falls Church, Virginia